"Cancer Man" is the fourth episode of the first season of the American television drama series Breaking Bad. Written by Vince Gilligan and directed by Jim McKay, it aired on AMC in the United States and Canada on February 17, 2008.

Plot 
Hank Schrader and his Drug Enforcement Administration (DEA) team have a meeting over the disappearances of Emilio Koyama and Krazy-8, the latter of whom is revealed to have been their informant. Hank also reports on their discovery of 99.1% pure methamphetamine. Although the DEA had no leads, Hank believes the product is good enough to make someone Albuquerque's new meth kingpin. Meanwhile, Walt tells Hank, Marie Schrader, and Walt Jr. about his cancer; Skyler White has already been told. Jesse Pinkman smokes Walt's meth with two friends, and flees his house the next morning when he hallucinates that two Mormon Missionaries at his door are armed bikers.

Skyler makes an appointment with one of the top oncologists in the country, even though the family cannot afford him. Walt says he will take the money out from his pension, but in fact uses some of the money taken from Krazy-8 in the desert, which he keeps hidden in an air-conditioning duct at his house. Walt Jr. berates his father for his attitude towards his cancer. When Walt goes to his credit union to put the cash in a cashier's check, his parking spot is stolen by an obnoxious man named Ken. Ken annoys Walt and the rest of the customers with his loud and socially inappropriate cell phone conversation.

Jesse ends up fleeing to his affluent parents' house, where he sleeps for an entire day. He attempts to bond with his overachieving little brother, Jake. That night, Jesse gets a call from one of the friends who smoked Walt's meth, who says that he knows a lot of wealthy people looking to score drugs and are willing to pay top dollar for the high-quality meth he cooked. The next day, Jesse visits Walt to discuss their dealings, but Walt kicks Jesse out. Jesse gives Walt his half of the meth profit  $4,000. The oncologist tells Walt that the cancer has spread to his lymph nodes, but there is a chance it is still treatable with chemotherapy.

At the Pinkman residence, a housekeeper finds a joint in Jesse's room, resulting in his parents kicking him out. The joint belonged to Jake, who thanks Jesse for taking the blame for him. While Jesse is waiting for a taxi outside the house, Jake asks for his joint back, which Jesse throws away saying it was of poor quality.

At home, Walt expresses his doubts about the chemotherapy since it will cost $90,000 and if he still dies, he will leave his family with all the debt. Walt Jr. angrily says that Walt should just die if he is going to give up so easily. Walt suffers a coughing attack while driving and coughs up blood. As he pulls into a gas station, he notices Ken pull up. When Ken leaves his car unattended, Walt takes a squeegee and shorts the car battery with it. The battery subsequently overheats and explodes as Walt walks back to his car.

Production 
The episode was written by Vince Gilligan and directed by Jim McKay; it aired on AMC in the United States and Canada on February 17, 2008.
	

The title "Cancer Man" is a reference to The X-Files character Cigarette Smoking Man, whom Mulder first called Cancer Man. Vince Gilligan was previously a writer and producer for that series.

Critical reception 
The episode received mostly positive reviews. Seth Amitin of IGN gave the episode a rating of 8.6 out of 10, commenting: "This seemed like an ordinary episode, but a lot of subversive plot and character development happened and if you've been watching the previous episodes, you probably know why this episode was so good. There's a lot to extrapolate." Donna Bowman of The A.V. Club gave the episode a "B−", saying: "This episode doesn't have the wow factor that the series has had so far -- it's about moving the pieces into place for long-term strategy."

In 2019 The Ringer ranked "Cancer Man" 43rd out of the 62 total Breaking Bad episodes. Vulture.com ranked it 56th overall.

References

External links 
 "Cancer Man"  at the official Breaking Bad site
 

2008 American television episodes
Breaking Bad (season 1) episodes
Television episodes written by Vince Gilligan